Ninagawa (written: 蜷川) is a Japanese surname. Notable people with the surname include:

, Japanese photographer and film director
, Japanese actress
, Japanese theatre director

Japanese-language surnames